Adlerfels is a mountain of Saxony, in southeastern Germany.

Mountains of Saxony